Herpestidae is a family of mammals in the order Carnivora, composed of the mongooses and the meerkat. A member of this family is called a mongoose or a herpestid. They are widespread primarily throughout Africa and south Asia, and are found primarily in forests, savannas, shrublands, and grasslands, though some species can be found in wetlands or deserts. Most mongooses are 30–60 cm (12–24 in) long, plus a 20–40 cm (8–16 in) tail, though the Ethiopian dwarf mongoose can be as small as 18 cm (7 in) plus a 12 cm (5 in) tail, and the white-tailed mongoose can be up to 104 cm (41 in) plus a 47 cm (14 in) tail. Most species do not have population estimates, though one, the Liberian mongoose, is classified as vulnerable with a population size of around 5,000. No herpestid species have been domesticated.

The 34 species of Herpestidae are split into 14 genera within 2 subfamilies: Herpestinae, comprising 23 extant species that are native to southern Europe, Africa and Asia, and Mungotinae, comprising 11 extant species native to Africa. Extinct species have also been placed into both subfamilies, though some older extinct species have not been categorized into a subfamily. Around ten extinct Herpestidae species have been discovered, though due to ongoing research and discoveries the exact number and categorization is not fixed. Herpestidae is believed to have diverged from the existing Feliformia suborder around 21.8 million years ago in the Early Miocene.

Conventions

Conservation status codes listed follow the International Union for Conservation of Nature (IUCN) Red List of Threatened Species. Range maps are provided wherever possible; if a range map is not available, a description of the herpestid's range is provided. Ranges are based on the IUCN Red List for that species unless otherwise noted.

Classification
The family Herpestidae consists of 34 extant species belonging to 15 genera in 2 subfamilies and divided into dozens of extant subspecies. This does not include hybrid species or extinct prehistoric species.

 Subfamily Herpestinae
 Genus Atilax: one species
 Genus Bdeogale: three species
 Genus Cynictis: one species
 Genus Herpestes: five species
 Genus Ichneumia: one species
 Genus Paracynictis: one species
 Genus Rhynchogale: one species
 Genus Urva: nine species
 Genus Xenogale: one species
 Subfamily Mungotinae
 Genus Crossarchus: four species
 Genus Dologale: one species
 Genus Helogale: two species
 Genus Liberiictis: one species
 Genus Mungos: two species
 Genus Suricata: one species

Herpestids
The following classification is based on the taxonomy described by Mammal Species of the World (2005), with augmentation by proposals accepted by the American Society of Mammalogists since using molecular phylogenetic analysis.

Subfamily Herpestinae

Subfamily Mungotinae

Prehistoric herpestids
In addition to extant herpestids, a number of prehistoric species have been discovered and classified as a part of herpestidae. There is no generally accepted classification of extinct herpestid species. In addition to being placed within extant genera in the extant subfamilies Herpestinae and Mungotinae, several have not been classified within a subfamily. The species listed here are based on data from the Paleobiology Database. Where available, the approximate time period the species was extant is given in millions of years before the present (Mya), also based on data from the Paleobiology Database. All listed species are extinct; where a genus or subfamily within herpestidae comprises only extinct species, it is indicated with a dagger symbol .

 Subfamily Herpestinae
 Genus Herpestes (16 Mya–present)
 H. abdelalii (3.6–2.5 Mya)
 H. auropunctatus
 H. gracilis
 H. microdon
 H. rubrifons
 Genus Ichneumia (3.6 Mya–present)
 I. nims (3.6–2.5 Mya)

 Subfamily Mungotinae
 Genus Crossarchus
 C. zebra

 Unclassified
 Genus Kichechia (21–15 Mya)
 K. savagei (21–15 Mya)
 K. zamanae (21–15 Mya)
 Genus Legetetia
 Genus Ugandictis (21–15 Mya)
 U. napakensis (21–15 Mya)

References

 
herpestidae
herpestidae